Big Ship is the second extended play (EP) by the English band Cardiacs, released in January 1987 by the Alphabet Business Concern. It is an album-sized vinyl record played at the speed of a single (45rpm) and was issued with a lyric insert. It was the first Cardiacs release to exclusively feature the so-called classic 1980s line-up of the band (Tim Smith on lead vocals and guitar, Jim Smith on bass guitar and backing vocals, William D. Drake on keyboards and backing vocals, Sarah Smith on saxophones and backing vocals, Tim Quy on percussion and Dominic Luckman on drums).

The anthemic title track has become a key Cardiacs song, played at nearly every concert and appearing on most of their live albums. "Tarred and Feathered" and "Burn Your House Brown" were also played by the band into the 1990s and 2000s.

Trivia

The song "Tarred and Feathered" incorporates, as its final lyric segment, the third verse of the hymn "O God, who metest in thine hand" by Richard Frederick Littledale.

Critical reception 

In Melody Maker, Mick Mercer reviewed Big Ship in skeptical tones. While praising the "impressively restrained operation" of "Stoneage Dinosaurs", he also noted that "the title track sounds like those ancient monsters Procol Harum, trapped in some horrendous storm. Memories of Gruppo Sportivo even come sneaking through, but The Cardiacs hold their own ridiculous heads high, only wreaking their vocals, the heavy keyboards and thumping bass refusing to crumble. Unfortunately "Tarred and Feathered" sounds like spotty kids running round a piano, while the dustbin drums of "Burn Your House Down" reminds me only of dreamy Saturday afternoons when the Play Away band would do their thing." Mercer also commented that "with Cardiacs everything is accidental, especially good taste. Arrest these peasants before they get another chance."

The mini-album was given a similarly lukewarm review by Julian Henry in Underground. In his view the album didn't "live up to (the band's) visual appearance", although he went on to call it "clever" and "humorous in a jolly titter-titter way".

Availability and reissuing 

Big Ship has been reissued from the Alphabet Business Concern label and is available on CD..  All of the tracks from the mini-album were reissued on the Songs for Ships and Irons compilation (originally released in 1991 and reissued on CD in 1995).

Track listing 
All songs written by Tim Smith unless otherwise indicated.

Personnel 
Credits adapted from Big Ship EP liner notes.

Cardiacs
Tim Smith – lead vocals, electric guitar
Jim Smith – electric bass, vocals
Sarah Smith – saxophones, clarinets, vocals
William D. Drake – electric and acoustic keyboards, vocals
Dominic Luckman – drums, vocals
Tim Quy – marimba, synthesizer, percussion

Production
Tim Smith – production
Graham Simmonds – production, audio mixing
Mark Cawthra – sound engineering

References 

Cardiacs albums
1987 EPs